The 2019 World Junior Speed Skating Championships took place from 15 to 17 February 2019 in Stadio del Ghiaccio, Baselga di Piné, Italy. They were the 46th World Junior Speed Skating Championships.

Schedule
All times are local (UTC+1).

Medal summary

Medal table

Men's events

Women's events

References

External links
Official website 

2019
World Junior Speed Skating Championships
International speed skating competitions hosted by Italy
World Junior Speed Skating Championships
Sport in Trentino
World Junior Speed Skating Championships
2019 in youth sport